The Caribbean Club Shield, also known as the CFU Club Shield, was an annual Caribbean football competition for clubs that were members of the Caribbean Football Union (CFU). It was a second-tier competition to the Caribbean Club Championship, and was introduced in 2018 for clubs which worked towards professional standards. It was ran by CONCACAF and was known as the CONCACAF Caribbean Club Shield.

The winner of this competition, as long as it fulfills the CONCACAF Regional Club Licensing criteria, played against the fourth-placed team of the Caribbean Club Championship for the place in the CONCACAF League.

With the expansion of the CONCACAF Champions League starting from the 2023–24 edition, the 2022 edition of the Caribbean Club Shield was the last held. Instead, a regional cup tournament, the Caribbean Cup, will be launched as a qualifying tournament of the CONCACAF Champions League for teams from the Caribbean, besides those which qualify directly through their professional leagues.

History
The CONCACAF Council, at its meeting on 25 July 2017 in San Francisco, California approved the implementation of the following two-tier competitions for affiliated clubs of Caribbean Member Associations starting in 2018:
The Tier 1 competition, known as the CONCACAF Caribbean Club Championship, is contested by the champions and runners-up of the top professional and semi-professional leagues in year 1 (2018), and open to only fully professional leagues in year 2 (2019) and onwards.
The Tier 2 competition, known as the CONCACAF Caribbean Club Shield, was contested by the champions of the top leagues in Member Associations that had no professional or semi-professional leagues in year 1 (2018), and opened to amateur and semi-professional leagues in year 2 (2019) and until (2022).

Results

See also
Caribbean Club Championship
CONCACAF League
CONCACAF Champions League

Notes and references

External links 
 Caribbean Football Union
 CFU Championship, RSSSF.com

 
International club association football competitions in the Caribbean
Defunct CONCACAF club competitions
Caribbean Football Union
Recurring sporting events established in 2018
Recurring events disestablished in 2022
2018 establishments in North America
2022 disestablishments in North America